Nereo Bolzon (born July 27, 1960) is a former Canadian football linebacker who played one season with the Edmonton Eskimos of the Canadian Football League. He was a territorial exemption of the Edmonton Eskimos in the 1982 CFL Draft. He played CIS football at the University of Alberta.

References

External links
Just Sports Stats

Living people
1960 births
Players of Canadian football from Alberta
Canadian football linebackers
Alberta Golden Bears football players
Edmonton Elks players
Canadian football people from Edmonton